"I Can Love You" is a song by American recording artist Mary J. Blige. It was written by Blige along with her sister LaTonya Blige-DaCosta, Rodney Jerkins, and Lil' Kim for her third album, Share My World (1997), with Jerkins producing the song and Lil Kim having featured vocals. In addition, the song also features a sample of the song "Queen Bitch," a track from Kim's debut album Hard Core (1996), co-written by Carlos Broady and Nashiem Myrick. "I Can Love You" was released as the second single from Share My World in the US, where it reached number 28 on the Billboard Hot 100.

Release and reception
"I Can Love You" was issued as a commercial single in America, unlike the first single "Love Is All We Need". Ultimately, it peaked at number two on the R&B singles chart and number twenty-eight on the American pop chart. In the UK, the song was released as the b-side to "Missing You".

Critical reception
Larry Flick from Billboard wrote, "R&B radio has already deemed this second single from the gorgeous Share My World as a deserved smash—now it's time for pop programmers to do the same. Like its predecessor, "Love Can Turn Around", this jam cruises at an uplifting jeep-funk pace, with Miss Blige getting sultry over layers of soothing love chants tightly arranged by producer-of-the-moment Rodney Jerkins. The result is a wickedly catchy jam that will sooth a brow fevered by the ongoing spree of factory-like funk that crowds the airwaves. Top 40 will probably focus on the snug rap-free edit, though the more airy and expansive album version has a guest rhyme by Lil' Kim that's quite cute and well worth a listen."

Music video
The accompanying music video for "I Can Love You" was shot in May 1997 and directed by Kevin Bray. Shot at a house and forest, It features Mary, Kim, and other people that are partying and having fun.

Credits and personnel
Credits adapted from the Share My World liner notes.
 Mary J. Blige – lead vocals, background vocals
 LaTonya Blige-DaCosta – background vocals
 Rodney Jerkins – production
 Lil' Kim – additional vocals

Charts

Weekly charts

Year-end charts

References

1997 singles
Mary J. Blige songs
Lil' Kim songs
Song recordings produced by Rodney Jerkins
Songs written by Rodney Jerkins
Songs written by Mary J. Blige
Songs written by Lil' Kim
MCA Records singles
1997 songs